Las Vegas Outlaws may refer to:

 Las Vegas Outlaws (XFL), American football team in the XFL
 Las Vegas Outlaws (arena football), Arena Football League team